1989–90 FIS Alpine Ski Europa Cup was the 19th season of the FIS Alpine Ski Europa Cup.

In this season neither male nor female downhill was disputed, so the discipline Cup was not awarded.

Standings

Overall

Super G

Giant Slalom

Slalom

References

External links
 

FIS Alpine Ski Europa Cup